Liam Watkinson (born 27 July 1991) is an English cricketer. He is a right-handed batsman and was a right-arm medium-pace bowler.

He made his first-class debut for Leeds/Bradford MCCU against Sussex on 2 April 2015. His father is former international cricketer Mike Watkinson, who played four Tests and a single One Day International for England between 1995 and 1996, and also played for Lancashire between 1982 and 2000.

References

External links

1991 births
Living people
English cricketers
Leeds/Bradford MCCU cricketers
Cricketers from Bolton
Cumberland cricketers